The following is a list of LGBT historic places in the United States. It includes sites that are recognized at the federal, state, county, or municipal level as important to the history of the LGBT civil rights movement. They represent the achievements and struggles of the community and provide context to understand these events and people. The National Park Service is amid an effort to chronicle LGBT sites across the nation, and have identified almost 400 of interest.

Historic sites

References

 
Lists of buildings and structures in the United States
Lists of places in the United States
United States history-related lists